Martin Kove (born March 6th is an American actor. He is best known for his role as John Kreese, the main antagonist of The Karate Kid (1984). He reprised the role in The Karate Kid Part II (1986), The Karate Kid Part III (1989), and the television series Cobra Kai (2018–present). Kove also appeared as Nero the Hero in Death Race 2000 (1975), and afterward as Clem in White Line Fever (1975). He was a regular on the TV series Cagney and Lacey (1982–1988), portraying Police Detective Victor Isbecki. He appeared in Rambo: First Blood Part II (1985) and Quentin Tarantino's Once Upon a Time in Hollywood (2019).

Early life

Kove was born in New York City on March 6, 1946 in the borough of Brooklyn to a Jewish American family.

Career
From 1982-88, Kove appeared in the main cast of Cagney & Lacey as New York City Detective Victor Isbecki, a supporting role he reprised in subsequent television movies for the series. During the same time, Kove appeared in the 1984 hit film The Karate Kid as Cobra Kai sensei John Kreese, whose fighting instruction of showing “no mercy” and to “sweep the leg” during the film’s karate tournament entered the American zeitgeist. After playing a traitorous helicopter pilot in the 1985 film Rambo: First Blood Part II, he returned as Kreese for the 1986 sequel The Karate Kid Part II and the 1989 sequel The Karate Kid Part III.

He studied Okinawa-te Karate under prominent black belt Gordon Doversola Shihan.

He appeared in the 2007 music video for the song "Sweep the Leg" by No More Kings as a caricature of himself and John Kreese from The Karate Kid.

In 2018, Kove again returned to the character of Kreese for the YouTube Premium web series, Cobra Kai, a continuation of The Karate Kid franchise set 34 years after the 1984 film. The series debuted on May 2, 2018, and was met with critical success. The show was renewed for a second season, which was published on April 24, 2019. In June 2020, Netflix purchased the series, producing a third, fourth and fifth season.

In 2019, Kove parodied his Karate Kid character in a QuickBooks commercial, in which a kinder, gentler Kreese runs a "Koala Kai" dojo of preteen students who are encouraged to "support the leg" and to show "more mercy".

In September 2021, Kove was announced as one of the celebrities competing on season 30 of Dancing with the Stars. He and his professional dance partner, Britt Stewart, were the first couple to be eliminated.

Personal life 
Kove is the father of twins, born in 1990. One of the twins, Jesse Kove, portrayed the young man who bullies the younger version of his father’s character, John Kreese, in flashbacks for seasons 3 and 4 of Cobra Kai.

Jesse Kove is also slated to star in the forthcoming films A Taste of Love and Wyatt Earp.

Filmography

Film

Television

Video Games

 Cobra Kai 2: Dojos Rising (2022) as John Kreese (voice role)

References

Further reading
 Voisin, Scott, Character Kings: Hollywood's Familiar Faces Discuss the Art & Business of Acting. BearManor Media, 2009. .

External links

20th-century American male actors
21st-century American male actors
American male film actors
American male karateka
American male television actors
Age controversies
Jewish American male actors
Living people
Male actors from New York City
People from Brooklyn
Year of birth missing (living people)